Martin Birkhead (died 1590), of Wakefield and York, was an English politician.

He was a Member (MP) of the Parliament of England for Ripon in 1571 and 1572.

References

Year of birth missing
1590 deaths
Politicians from Wakefield
Politicians from York
English MPs 1571
English MPs 1572–1583
Members of the Parliament of England for constituencies in Yorkshire